Panaqolus claustellifer is a species of catfish in the family Loricariidae. It is native to South America, where it occurs in the Takutu River and the Branco River in Brazil and Guyana. The species reaches 6.2 cm (2.4 inches) SL. While not described until 2016, it was known to aquarists before its formal description. In the aquarium trade, it is typically referred to either as the blood-red tiger pleco or by one of its two associated L-numbers, which are L-306 and LDA-064. Its specific epithet means "keyhole-bearing" in Latin, referring to the distinctive markings present on the species' snout.

References 

Ancistrini
Fish described in 2016